This article contains information about the literary events and publications of 1607.

Events
January 22 – Shortly before his death, bookseller Cuthbert Burby transfers the rights to print the text of The Taming of the Shrew to Nicholas Ling.
February 2 – The King's Men perform Barnes's The Devil's Charter at the English Court.
June 5 – Physician John Hall marries Susanna, daughter of William Shakespeare.
September 5 – Hamlet is performed aboard the East India Company ship Red Dragon, under the command of Captain William Keeling, anchored off the coast of Sierra Leone, the first known performance of a Shakespeare play outside England in English, and the first by amateurs.
September 30 – Richard II is performed aboard the Dragon.
unknown dates
First performance of the first wholly parodic play in English, Francis Beaumont's The Knight of the Burning Pestle, unsuccessfully, probably by child actors at the Blackfriars Theatre in London.
The King's Revels Children are active as a playing company in London: their repertoire includes Edward Sharpham's Cupid's Whirligig and Thomas Middleton's The Family of Love.

New books

Prose
William Alabaster – Apparatus in Revelationem Jesu Christi
John Cowell – The Interpreter (suppressed by the English House of Commons for excessive royalism)
Michael Drayton – The Legend of Great Cromwell
Antoine Loysel – Institutes coutumières
César Oudin – Thrésor des deux langues françoise et espagnole
Lawrence Twine – The Pattern of Painful Adventures, second edition; a source for Shakespeare's Pericles, Prince of Tyre
Honoré d'Urfé – L'Astrée (part 1)

Drama
William Alexander, 1st Earl of Stirling – The Monarchic Tragedies (second edition adding The Alexandrean and Julius Caesar to closet dramas Croesus and Darius
Anonymous – Claudius Tiberius Nero
Barnabe Barnes – The Devil's Charter
Francis Beaumont – The Knight of the Burning Pestle
Beaumont and Fletcher – The Woman Hater (published, earliest of their collaborations to appear in print)
Thomas Campion – Lord Hay's Masque
George Chapman – Bussy D'Ambois (published)
John Day, William Rowley, and George Wilkins – The Travels of the Three English Brothers
Thomas Dekker – The Whore of Babylon
Thomas Dekker and John Webster – Westward Ho and Northward Ho published
Dekker & Webster, with Henry Chettle (?), Thomas Heywood (?), and Wentworth Smith (?) – Sir Thomas Wyatt (published)
Thomas Heywood – The Fair Maid of the Exchange (published)
Ben Jonson – Volpone (published)
John Marston – What You Will (published)
Thomas Middleton
Michaelmas Term (performed)
The Phoenix (published)
The Puritan (published as "written by W.S.")
The Revenger's Tragedy (published)
Edward Sharpham – Cupid's Whirligig
Thomas Tomkis – Lingua (published)
George Wilkins – The Miseries of Enforced Marriage (published)

Poetry
Thomas Dekker – The Seven Deadly Sins of London

Births
March 8 – Johann von Rist, German poet (died 1667)
July 10 – Philippe Labbe, French Jesuit writer (died 1667)
October 4 – Francisco de Rojas Zorrilla, Spanish dramatist (died c. 1660)
November 1 – Georg Philipp Harsdorffer, German poet and translator (died 1658)
November 5 – Anna Maria van Schurman, Dutch poet (died 1678)
November 15 – Madeleine de Scudéry, French writer (died 1701)
Unknown dates
Alaol, Bengali poet (died 1673)
Antoine Gombaud, French essayist (died 1684)
Filadelfo Mugnos, Italian historian (died 1675)
Francisco Núñez de Pineda y Bascuñán, Chilean writer and soldier (died 1682)

Deaths
January 6 – Guidobaldo del Monte, Italian philosopher (born 1545)
May – Sir Edward Dyer, English poet (born 1543)
June – Thomas Newton, English physician, clergyman, poet, author and translator (born c. 1542)
June 19 – Johannes Bertelius, historian of Luxembourg (born 1544)
June 30 – Caesar Baronius, Italian ecclesiastical historian (born 1538)
July 6 – Achille Gagliardi, Italian theologian (born 1537)
July 7 – Penelope Rich, Lady Rich, English noblewoman, inspiration for Sir Philip Sidney's "Stella" (born 1563)
October 31 – Wawrzyniec Grzymała Goślicki, Polish philosopher (born c. 1540)
Unknown dates
Cuthbert Burby, English publisher and bookseller
Dinko Ranjina, Croatian poet (born 1536)
Probable year of death – Henry Chettle, English dramatist (born c. 1564)

References

 
Years of the 17th century in literature